There have been several political parties in Sweden with the name Socialist Party:

 Socialist Party (Sweden, 1929), Socialistiska partiet, 1929–1944
 Socialist Party (Sweden, 1971)

Socialist Party (Sweden) may also refer to:
 Left Socialist Party (Sweden), Vänstersocialistiska partiet, 1940–1963)
 Revolutionary Socialist Party (Sweden), Revolutionära socialistiska partiet, 1950–1951
 Socialist Workers' Party of Sweden
 Socialist Justice Party